Suzhou Ferris Wheel is a  tall giant Ferris wheel on the east bank of Jinji Lake in Suzhou, Jiangsu, China. It has 60 passenger cabins, a maximum capacity of 300 passengers, and takes approximately 20 minutes to complete each revolution.

Suzhou Ferris Wheel was completed in 2009. It is one of four 120 m Ferris wheels in China, the other three being Changsha Ferris Wheel (completed 2004), Tianjin Eye (completed 2008), and Zhengzhou Ferris Wheel (completed 2003). The only Chinese Ferris wheel with a greater height is the  Star of Nanchang, which opened in 2006.

References 

Ferris wheels in China
Buildings and structures in Suzhou
Tourist attractions in Suzhou
Parks in Suzhou
Buildings and structures completed in 2009
2009 establishments in China